The Storm is a 1938 American action film directed by Harold Young and written by Theodore Reeves, Daniel Moore and Hugh King. The film stars Charles Bickford, Barton MacLane, Preston Foster, Tom Brown, Nan Grey, Andy Devine, Frank Jenks and Samuel S. Hinds. The film was released on October 28, 1938, by Universal Pictures.

Plot

Cast        
Charles Bickford as Bob Roberts
Barton MacLane as Capt. Cogswell
Preston Foster as Jack Stacey
Tom Brown as Jim Roberts 
Nan Grey as Peggy Phillips
Andy Devine as Swede Hanzen
Frank Jenks as Peter Carey 
Samuel S. Hinds as Capt. Kenny
Florence Roberts as Mrs. Roberts
Jack Mulhall as Harry Blake 
Helen Gilliland as Hungry 
Mark Daniels as Cadet 
Joe Sawyer as Kelly 
Marion Martin as Jane 
Dorothy Arnold as Nora

References

External links
 

1938 films
American action films
1930s action films
Universal Pictures films
Films directed by Harold Young (director)
American black-and-white films
1930s English-language films
1930s American films